Dangerous may refer to:

Film and television
 Dangerous (1935 film), an American film starring Bette Davis
 Dangerous: The Short Films, a 1993 collection of music videos by Michael Jackson
 Dangerous (2021 film), a Canadian-American action thriller
 Dangerous (TV series), a 2007 Australian drama
 Dangerous (web series), a 2020 Indian Hindi-language crime thriller

Music
 Dangerous!, an Australian punk band
 Dangerous World Tour, Michael Jackson's 1992–93 world concert tour
 Dangerous Records, a British record label associated with Sawmills Studios

Albums
 Dangerous (Andy Taylor album), 1990
 Dangerous (The Bar Kays album) or the title song, 1984
 Dangerous (Michael Jackson album) or the title song (see below), 1991
 Dangerous (Natalie Cole album) or the title song, 1985
 Dangerous (SpeXial album) or the title song, 2015
 Dangerous (Yandel album), 2015
 Dangerous: The Double Album, by Morgan Wallen, or the title song, 2021
 Dangerous, by DecembeRadio, or the title song, 2005
 Dangerous, by KJ-52, or the title song, 2012

Songs
 "Dangerous" (Big Data song), 2013
 "Dangerous" (Busta Rhymes song), 1997
 "Dangerous" (Cascada song), 2009
 "Dangerous" (David Guetta song), 2014
 "Dangerous" (The Doobie Brothers song), 1991
 "Dangerous" (James Blunt song), 2011
 "Dangerous" (Kardinal Offishall song), 2008
 "Dangerous" (Loverboy song), 1985
 "Dangerous" (M. Pokora song), 2008
 "Dangerous" (Meek Mill song), 2018
 "Dangerous" (Michael Jackson song), 1991
 "Dangerous" (Penny Ford song), 1985
 "Dangerous" (Roxette song), 1989
 "Dangerous" (Rumer song), 2014
 "Dangerous" (S-X song), 2020
 "Dangerous" (Seether song), 2020
 "Dangerous" (Within Temptation song), 2013
 "Dangerous" (Ying Yang Twins song), 2006
 "Dangerous", by Before You Exit, 2014
 "Dangerous", by Comethazine from Bawskee 3.5, 2019
 "Dangerous", by Def Leppard from Def Leppard, 2015
 "Dangerous", by Depeche Mode, B-side of "Personal Jesus", 1989
 "Dangerous", by Ella Mai from Ella Mai, 2018
 "Dangerous", by Groove Coverage from Riot on the Dancefloor, 2012
 "Dangerous", by Group 1 Crew from Fearless, 2012
 "Dangerous", by Jennifer Hudson from JHUD, 2014
 "Dangerous", by Jessie J from R.O.S.E., 2018
 "Dangerous", by Ladyhawke from Wild Things, 2016
 "Dangerous", by My American Heart Hiding Inside the Horrible Weather, 2007
 "Dangerous", by NEFFEX, 2018
 "Dangerous", by Nick Jonas from Spaceman, 2021
 "Dangerous", by Schoolboy Q from Crash Talk, 2019
 "Dangerous", by Shinee from The Misconceptions of Us, 2013
 "Dangerous", by Shaman's Harvest from Smokin' Hearts & Broken Guns, 2014
 "Dangerous", by the Who, B-side of "It's Hard", 1982
 "Dangerous", by the xx from I See You, 2017
 "Dangerous" by Madison Beer, 2022

Other uses
 Chris Dangerous (born 1978), Swedish musician
 Dangerous (Bill Hicks album), a comedy album, 1990
 Dangerous (book), a 2017 autobiography by Milo Yiannopoulos 
 Dangerous (horse) (foaled 1830), a British Thoroughbred racehorse
 Dangerous Reef, in Spencer Gulf, South Australia

See also
 
 , pages beginning with Dangerous in quotes
 Danger (disambiguation)
 Dangerously (disambiguation)